Avant-garde theatre may refer to:

 French avant-garde theatre
 Russian avant-garde
 Experimental theatre

20th-century theatre
Theatrical genres